Maxwell John Brown (died 25 October 2012) was an Australian politician who represented the South Australian House of Assembly seat of Whyalla for the Labor Party from 1970 to 1985.

References

 

2012 deaths
Australian Labor Party members of the Parliament of South Australia
Members of the South Australian House of Assembly